Addie Jo "Jody" Conradt (born May 13, 1941) is a retired women's basketball coach. She was the head coach for the women's team at University of Texas at Austin (UT). Her coaching career spanned 38 years, with the last 31 years at UT from 1976 to 2007. She also served concurrently as the UT women's athletic director from 1992 to 2001. During her tenure at UT, she achieved several notable personal and team milestones in collegiate basketball. At retirement, she had tallied 900 career victories, second place in all time victories for an NCAA Division I basketball coach. Conradt was inducted in the inaugural class at the Women's Basketball Hall of Fame in 1999.

High school and college
Addie Jo Conradt was born in Goldthwaite, Texas, United States to Ann and Charles Conradt. Both her parents were athletic, with her mother playing competitively on a local softball team, and her father playing semi-pro baseball. She was a standout basketball player at Goldthwaite High School, where she averaged 40 points per game. Many people growing up in Goldthwaite stayed there, according to Conradt, but she got a sense that one could have larger ambitions when a Goldthwaite native, Marie Reynolds, joined the All American Red Heads Team, a barnstorming basketball team which played throughout the United States and around the world. After high school, Conradt played collegiate basketball at Baylor University, earning a degree in physical education in 1963. She finished her collegiate basketball career averaging 20 points per game. After graduation, she taught and coached at Waco Midway High School and earned her master's degree from Baylor in 1969.

College coaching
Prior to Conradt's career at UT, she served as women's basketball head coach at Sam Houston State University from 1969 to 1973, where her teams had a record of 74–23. She then coached at the University of Texas at Arlington from 1973 to 1976, where her teams had a record of 43–39.

In 1975, in response to Title IX, the University of Texas created a separate women's athletic department. In 1976, they hired Donna Lopiano to become the first women's athletic director. The following year, Lopiano hired Conradt as coach of the women's basketball team. Conradt had attracted national attention while at the University of Texas at Arlington. After two losing seasons, they went 23–11 in the 1975–76 seasons, upsetting powerful opponents. Texas planned to bring the women's program to national prominence, and they felt Conradt was the right coach for the job. Teams coached by Condradt were using tactics not seen in many other places, such as full court pressure, double low posts and a transition game.

In Conradt's first season, the team went 36–10. The team was ranked in the AP top ten in the nation all but one year in the 1980s, including a string of four years, from 1984 to 1988, where they earned the number one in the nation ranking. The success translated into fan support — the team was averaging 7,500 fans per game by the end of the 1980s, including such state and national leaders as future governor Ann Richards and US Congresswoman Barbara Jordan.

In the 1985 NCAA tournament, the Lady Longhorns lost a heartbreaking game to Western Kentucky 92–90. Watching the game was highly recruited Clarissa Davis, who had not yet decided where to go to school. She resolved to go to Texas, and help them. The following year, Texas would win the national championship with the first undefeated women's season, with a record of 34–0. Although Davis wasn't a starter on the team, she ended up earning the tournament's most valuable player award.

In 38 seasons Conradt's head coaching record was 900–306. Her record of 900 career victories is second only to that of Pat Summitt. During her tenure at UT, her record was 783–245. Between January 1978, and January 1990, Conradt's Lady Longhorns did not lose a Southwest Conference game, a streak of 183 consecutive conference victories. From 1986 to 1991, Texas was the women's basketball attendance leader, including an NCAA record average of 8,481 for one season.

Over her career, Conradt has coached:
 28 players who went on to play professionally
 four US Olympians
 three players who earned a combined 13 national player of the year honors
 eight Kodak All-Americans

Conradt was inducted into the Basketball Hall of Fame in 1998 and into the Women's Basketball Hall of Fame in 1999. She is only the second woman inducted into the Naismith Hall of Fame.

Conradt was succeeded as UT women's basketball head coach by Gail Goestenkors, the former women's basketball head coach at Duke University.

In 2008, Conradt was honored, along with Dick Vitale, by the Atlanta Tipoff Club, with the Naismith Award, an honor presented annually that "pays tribute to the individuals who have made a significant impact on women's and men's college basketball".

After retiring from coaching, Conradt continued to work for the University of Texas as special assistant to the women's athletic director.

Head coaching record

Basketball

Volleyball

Awards and honors 
 1984 - Russell Athletic/WBCA National Coach of the Year
 1986 - Russell Athletic/WBCA National Coach of the Year
1986 - Texas Women's Hall of Fame
 1998 - Naismith Memorial Basketball Hall of Fame
 1999 - Inducted into the Inaugural class at the Women's Basketball Hall of Fame
 1995 - International Women's Sports Hall of Fame
 1995 International Scholar-Athlete Hall of Fame
 1997 - Texas Sports Hall of Fame
 1987 Carol Eckman Award - Women's Basketball Coaches Association
 1991 Outstanding Commitment to Women's Athletics - National Association for Girls and Women in Sports
 2000 UT Women's Athletics Hall of Honor
2003 Harvey Penick Award for Excellence in the Game of Life - Caritas of Austin
 2004 CASEY Award - Kansas City Sports Association
 Conference Coach of the Year - 1984, 1985, 1986, 1987, 1988, 1996, 2003, 2004
 National Coach of the Year - 1980, 1984, 1986, 1997, 2003, 2004
 2010 Lifetime Achievement Award by National Association Collegiate Women Athletics Administrators (NACWAA)

See also
List of college women's basketball coaches with 600 wins

Notes

References

External links
  Basketball Hall of Fame profile

1941 births
Living people
People from Goldthwaite, Texas
Basketball coaches from Texas
Basketball players from Texas
American volleyball coaches
American women's basketball coaches
American women's basketball players
Baylor Bears women's basketball players
Naismith Memorial Basketball Hall of Fame inductees
Sam Houston Bearkats women's basketball coaches
Texas Longhorns women's basketball coaches
Texas Longhorns women's volleyball coaches
UT Arlington Mavericks women's basketball coaches
UT Arlington Mavericks women's volleyball coaches